Tales of Kidd Funkadelic is the eighth studio album by the band Funkadelic, released in September 1976. It was their final album on the Westbound record label.  The tracks were recorded during the same sessions as their first release for Warner Brothers Records,  Hardcore Jollies; which was released a month later.  Two tracks from Tales of Kidd Funkadelic, the single “Undisco Kidd” and the party anthem “Take Your Dead Ass Home!” have been staples in the band’s live performances since the album’s 1976 release, and can be heard on the 1977 Parliament (band) concert album Live: P-Funk Earth Tour. The album opener “Butt-To-Buttresuscitation” and the song “I’m Never Gonna Tell It” were included in the band’s live shows during the early 2000s.  
The song "Let's Take It to the People" has been sampled by hip-hop band A Tribe Called Quest for their song "Everything Is Fair", on their album The Low End Theory.

Kidd Funkadelic was/is the nickname for guitarist Michael Hampton.

Track listing

Side One
 "Butt-to-Butt Resuscitation" (George Clinton, Eddie Hazel, Bernie Worrell, Michael Hampton) - 3:53
 "Let's Take It to the People" (Clinton, Hazel, Garry Shider) - 1:50 
 "Undisco Kidd" (Clinton, Bootsy Collins, Worrell) (released as a single-Westbound 5029) - 6:34 
 "Take Your Dead Ass Home! (Say Som'n Nasty)" (Clinton, Glenn Goins, Shider, Worrell) - 7:18

Side Two
 "I'm Never Gonna Tell It" (Clinton, Worrell) - 3:41 
 "Tales of Kidd Funkadelic (Opusdelite Years)" (Clinton, Worrell) - 12:56 
 "How Do Yeaw View You?" (Clinton, Collins, Worrell) (released as the B-side to "Undisco Kidd) - 3:39

Funkadelic Main Invasion Force (Personnel)
Guitars: Michael Hampton, Garry Shider, Glenn Goins
Keyboards, Synthesizers: Bernie Worrell
Bass: Cordell "Boogie" Mosson
Drums: Jerome "Bigfoot" Brailey
Percussion: Calvin Simon
Vocals: George Clinton, Ray Davis, Glen Goins, Clarence "Fuzzy" Haskins, Calvin Simon, Garry Shider, Grady Thomas
Maggotusi Vocal Choir (Backup Vocals): Jessica Cleaves, Cynthia Davis, Donna Davis, Debbie Edwards, Taka Kahn, Pamela Vincent, Debbie Wright, Gary “Mudbone” Cooper

Spastic Funkadelic Alumni

Eddie Hazel: Guitar
Billy "Bass" Nelson: Bass guitar
William "Bootsy" Collins: Bass guitar
Ron Bykowski: Lead guitar

References

External links
 Tales of Kidd Funkadelic at Discogs
 The Motherpage

Funkadelic albums
Westbound Records albums
1976 albums
Albums with cover art by Pedro Bell